Långtradarchaufförens berättelser ("The Lorry Driver's Stories") was the Sveriges Television's Christmas calendar in 1975.

Plot 
The main character, played by Beppe Wolgers, is travelling in his lorry together with the dolls Posi and Maggan.

Music 
An LP with the soundtrack music was also released the same year.

References

External links 
 

1975 Swedish television series debuts
1975 Swedish television series endings
Sveriges Television's Christmas calendar
Swedish television shows featuring puppetry
Television shows set in Sweden
Fictional truck drivers